Vaughn Pond is a  pond in Carver, Massachusetts near the center of the town.

External links
Environmental Protection Agency

Ponds of Plymouth County, Massachusetts
Ponds of Massachusetts